Under Cover is a lost 1916 American silent drama film directed by Robert G. Vignola, written by Doty Hobart and Roi Cooper Megrue, and starring Hazel Dawn, Owen Moore, William Courtleigh Jr., Ethel Fleming, Frank Losee, and Ida Darling. It was released on July 20, 1916, by Paramount Pictures. It was based on the 1914 Broadway play of the same name.

Plot
Ethel Cartwright, a woman just back from a trip to Paris, is called upon by U.S. government customs inspectors to help determine if a man she met in Paris possesses a valuable necklace. The story ends with a confrontation between the customs officers and the suspect.

Cast 
Hazel Dawn as Ethel Cartwright
Owen Moore as Steven Denby
William Courtleigh Jr. as Monty Vaughn
Ethel Fleming as Amy Cartwright
Frank Losee as Dan Taylor
Ida Darling as Mrs. Harrington

Adaptation
A one-hour radio adaptation was presented on Lux Radio Theatre on April 27, 1936, starring Richard Barthelmess and Sally Eilers.

References

External links 

 

1916 films
1910s English-language films
Silent American drama films
1916 drama films
Paramount Pictures films
Lost American films
Films directed by Robert G. Vignola
American black-and-white films
American silent feature films
American films based on plays
1916 lost films
Lost drama films
1910s American films